Sebastian Ngmenenso Sandaare (born 1 January 1974) is a Ghanaian politician and member of the Seventh Parliament of the Fourth Republic of Ghana representing the Daffiama-Bussie-Issa Constituency in the Upper West Region on the ticket of the National Democratic Congress.

Early life and education 
Sebastian was born on January 1, 1974, in Daffiama, Upper West Region. He holds a bachelor's degree from the Kwame Nkrumah Science and Technology and a master's degree in Public Health from the University of Ghana.

References

Ghanaian MPs 2017–2021
1974 births
Living people
National Democratic Congress (Ghana) politicians
University of Ghana alumni